Petite Arvine is a white wine grape planted in the Valais region of Switzerland.

Ampelographers revealed it to have originated in the Valais region in Switzerland and grown since 1602.

Designation: AOC Valais

Petite Arvine has a reputation as a high-class grape variety, and is seen as the best white wine grape of the Valais. Its wines are rich in extract and are found as dry, medium-dry and sweet wines.
This textured wine contains a generous amount of extract from its thick-skinned berries.

The ambassador of wines from the Valais.

Here is what you can expect from Petite Arvine.

Taste: Fragrant and fruity.

Fruit: Notes of grapefruit and lime.

Acidity: Elevated acidity.

Tannin: Little to no bitterness.

"The vintners regard it so highly that they've dedicated an entire village to it." Fully, Switzerland – Official Swiss tourism website.

Overall, wines produced from this varietal are made of very high quality.

Derived from Latin the name indicates the vine comes from the Savoyard Arve Valley in the Valais.

Food pairing
Petite Arvine can typically be enjoyed with typical Swiss foods. Seafoods such as lobster, oyster and sushi make for a good pairing as well.

References

White wine grape varieties